A sweeper is a small tropical fish of the family Pempheridae.

Sweeper or sweepers may also refer to:

Literature
 "The Sweepers" (poem), by Rudyard Kipling
 The Sweepers (play), by John C. Picardi, about Italian-Americans in WWII Boston

Entertainment
 Sweepers (film), a 1998 American and South African action film
 Lu Tze, a character nicknamed 'Sweeper' in the Discworld series
 Sweeper (Black Cat), a bounty hunter from the manga series Black Cat

Sports
 Sweeper (association football), a defensive position in association football
 Sweeper (horse), a Thoroughbred racehorse

Other uses
 Street sweeper, a person whose job is cleaning the streets or a machine for doing the same
 Carpet sweeper, a mechanical device for cleaning carpets and floors
 Vacuum cleaner, a similar device, sometimes called a "sweeper"
 Lawn sweeper, a garden tool for lawn care
 Radio sweeper, a short promotional sample used by radio stations
 An alternative term for a sweep account

See also
 Sweep
 Minesweeper